The India national women's cricket team toured England in June and July 2012, playing five One Day Internationals (ODIs) and two Twenty20 Internationals (T20Is) against the England cricket team, and one ODI against Ireland women's cricket team. England won the one-day series 3–2, and the Twenty20 series 2–0, while India won the only ODI against Ireland.

One Day International match against Ireland

Twenty20 International series

1st T20I

2nd T20I

One Day International series

1st ODI

2nd ODI

3rd ODI

4th ODI

5th ODI

References

England 2012
India Women
Women 2012
India 2012
2011–12 Indian women's cricket
2012–13 Indian women's cricket